Antonio Rinaldeschi (died 1501) was an Italian gambler and blasphemer, who gained notoriety for throwing dung at a painting of the Virgin Mary above the doorway of the church of Santa Maria degli Alberghi in Florence. Rinaldeschi was later executed and a cult developed after a piece of dung that remained resembled a crown above the Virgin's head.

Rinaldeschi's act was portrayed by the painter Filippo Dolciati in his 1502 painting The Story of Antonio Rinaldeschi.

References
 Robert C. Davis and Beth Lindsmith, Renaissance People, Thames and Hudson, 2011
 William J. Connell and Giles Constable, "Sacrilege and Redemption in Renaissance Florence: The Case of Antonio Rinaldeschi", Journal of the Warburg and Courtauld Institutes, Vol. 61, 1998. 
 William J. Connell and Giles Constable, Sacrilege and Redemption in Renaissance Florence:  The Case of Antonio Rinaldeschi, 2nd rev. ed., Toronto, CRRS, 2008.

1501 deaths
14th-century people of the Republic of Florence
People executed for blasphemy
Executed Italian people
Italian gamblers
Year of birth unknown
16th-century executions by Italian states